The First Universalist Church is a historic church at 250 Washington Street in Providence, Rhode Island.

The brick Gothic church was designed by Edwin L. Howland, a prominent local architect, and built in 1871–72.  It is the third sanctuary for a congregation that was founded in 1821 through the efforts of Reverend John Murray, "the founder of American Universalism".  It is one of the few remaining church buildings in central Providence, an area that once housed a large number of churches.

The church building was listed on the National Register of Historic Places in 1977.

See also
National Register of Historic Places listings in Providence, Rhode Island

External links

 First Universalist Church of Providence official website

References

Churches completed in 1872
19th-century Unitarian Universalist church buildings
Unitarian Universalist churches in Rhode Island
Churches on the National Register of Historic Places in Rhode Island
Universalist Church of America churches
Churches in Providence, Rhode Island
National Register of Historic Places in Providence, Rhode Island